Papun in Iran may refer to:
 Papun-e Olya
 Papun-e Sofla